Roberte Ponsonby, Countess of Bessborough (née Poupart de Neuflize)  (1892–1979), was a French noblewoman who married into the English aristocracy and served as Viceregal Consort of Canada in the 1930s.

Early life
She was the only daughter of Baron Jean Poupart de Neuflize and Madeleine Dolfuss-Davilliers and grew up in the family home, 7 Rue Alfred-de-Vigny, a Hôtel particulier in the 8th arrondissement of Paris. She had two older brothers, André Poupart de Neuflize (who married the American heiress Eva Barbey), and Jacques Poupart de Neuflize, a banker who succeeded their father in running the family bank.

Her mother was a granddaughter of French industrialist Jean Dollfus.

Personal life

On 25 June 1912, she married Vere Ponsonby, Viscount Duncannon (1880–1956), son of Edward Ponsonby, 8th Earl of Bessborough, and Blanche Vere Guest; she held the courtesy title of Viscountess Duncannon. Her husband inherited the title of Earl of Bessborough upon the death of his father on 1 December 1920, whereupon Roberte became the Countess of Bessborough. Together, they had three sons (two of whom predeceased their parents) and a daughter:

Frederick Edward Neuflize Ponsonby, 10th Earl of Bessborough (1913–1993), who married Mary Munn, a daughter of Charles A. Munn Jr. and Mary Astor Paul, in 1948.
Hon. Desmond Neuflize Ponsonby (1915–1925), who died after a riding accident.
Lady Moyra Blanche Madeleine Ponsonby (1918–2016), who married, as his second wife, Sir Denis John Wolko Browne, a son of Sylvester J. Browne, in 1945. Sir Denis' first wife, Helen de Guerry Simpson, died from cancer in 1940. 
Lt. Hon. George St Lawrence Neuflize Ponsonby (1931–1951), who died unmarried.

In 1924, they purchased a country house in England, known as Stansted House in Stoughton, West Sussex. On 2 Jun 1937, her husband was created Earl of Bessborough in the Peerage of the United Kingdom (the earlier earldom was created in the Peerage of Ireland).

Lord Bessborough died at Stansted House on 10 March 1956, and Lady Bessborough died in 1978.

Honours
She was invested as a Dame Grand Cross, Most Venerable Order of the Hospital of St. John of Jerusalem (GC.St.J). She was decorated with the Chevalier, Legion of Honour. She held the office of Justice of the Peace for West Sussex between 1943 and 1956.

References

External links

1892 births
1979 deaths
Roberte Ponsonby, Countess of Bessborough
British countesses
Irish countesses
Canadian viceregal consorts
Dames Grand Cross of the Order of St John
Daughters of barons
People from Stoughton, West Sussex
Date of birth unknown
Chevaliers of the Légion d'honneur
English justices of the peace
French emigrants to the United Kingdom
Wives of knights